The 2018 Clásica de San Sebastián was a road cycling one-day race that took place on 4 August in San Sebastián, Spain. It was the 38th edition of the Clásica de San Sebastián and the twenty-seventh event of the 2018 UCI World Tour. It was won by Julian Alaphilippe in the sprint ahead of Bauke Mollema.

Teams
22 teams of seven riders have been invited to take part in the race: 18 teams of the UCI WorldTeam category; and four of the Continental Professional category. Forming a peloton of 154 cyclists, the participating teams are:

Result

References

External links 
 

2018
2018 UCI World Tour
2018 in Spanish road cycling
August 2018 sports events in Spain